Sir John Beard (died 1685) was an administrator of the English East India Company. He served as the Chief Agent and President of Bengal in the late seventeenth century.

Beard wrote one of the earliest accounts of the legend of Gabriel Boughton. He died in Hooghly in 1685.

References

Presidents of Bengal
18th-century British people
17th-century English businesspeople
Year of birth missing
1685 deaths